Bedburn is a village in County Durham, in England. It is in the civil parish of South Bedburn, near Hamsterley, and Hamsterley Forest. The Bedburn Beck a tributary of the River Wear, flows past the village. The population of this civil parish at the 2011 census was 171.

References

External links

Villages in County Durham